Animosity is the second studio album by American heavy metal band Corrosion of Conformity. It was released on October 25, 1985. The album cover art was done by artist Pushead.

Track listing

Covers
 Metallica, longtime fans of Corrosion of Conformity, performed the song "Holier" at least twice live in concert (Los Angeles and Donington).
 Monster Voodoo Machine covered the song "Holier" on their 1998 release Direct Reaction Now! (it was the hidden track).
 Severed Head of State covered "Prayer" on their 2002 EP release No Love Lost.
 Mr. Bungle covered "Loss for Words" several times during their Disco Volante tour and released their version on The Raging Wrath of the Easter Bunny Demo in 2020.
 A cover of "Hungry Child" appears on Agoraphobic Nosebleed's compilation album Bestial Machinery (Discography Volume 1)
 All Out War covered "Mad World" as a hidden track on their 1998 LP "For Those Who Were Crucified".

Personnel
Corrosion of Conformity
Mike Dean – vocals, bass guitar
Woody Weatherman – guitars
Reed Mullin – drums, vocals

Production
Pushead – front cover
Simon Bob Sinister – back cover
Brian Slagel – executive producer
Bill Metoyer – engineering (tracks 1–5)
David Schmitt – engineering (track 6–10)
Eddy Schreyer – mastering

References

External links
 Encyclopedia Metallica: Metallica performs C.O.C.'s "Holier"
 A long review of Corrosion of Conformity – Animosity LP
 Mr. Bungle performs "Loss For Words" live

1985 albums
Corrosion of Conformity albums
Metal Blade Records albums
Albums with cover art by Pushead